Ministry of Foreign Affairs of Azerbaijan is a Cabinet-level governmental agency of Azerbaijan Republic in charge of conducting and designing the country's foreign policy.

The ministry was first established in 1918. In the Soviet era it largely lost its sovereign authority which was restored after Azerbaijan's independence in 1991.

History 
The Ministry of Foreign Affairs of Azerbaijan was established in 1918, during the first Republic of Azerbaijan. In that period, Azerbaijan gained international recognition and built diplomatic relations with several countries. In 1918–1920 there were representatives in Armenia, Georgia, Turkey, Turkistan, with embassy and authorized representative offices. Azerbaijan also had an authorized representative office at Paris Peace Conference under the leadership of Alimardan Topchubashov.

After the Bolsheviks occupied Azerbaijan in April, 1920, the Ministry of Foreign Affairs was abolished and was replaced by Azerbaijan SSR People's Foreign Affairs Commissariat (PFAC). People's Foreign Affairs Commissariat, despite having the relevant authority, implemented certain bilateral relations in foreign countries in 1920-1922, including Turkey, where Azerbaijan SSR had its own ambassador, Ibrahim Abilov. People's Foreign Affairs Commissioners of Azerbaijan were Nariman Narimanov and Mirza Davud Huseynov. But upon incorporation of Azerbaijan SSR into Transcaucasian SFSR  PFAC was abolished.

Towards the end of World War II, in 1944, the Soviet government restored Azerbaijani PFAC. In 1946 PFAC was transformed into Ministry of Foreign Affairs (MFA). But MFA still lacked relevant authority inside the Soviet Union. The last Foreign Minister of Azerbaijan SSR was Huseynaga Sadigov who led MFA also during seven months of independent Azerbaijan Republic.

After Azerbaijan gained its independence in 1991, MFA was transformed into a complex Cabinet-level agency, responsible for designing and conducting Azerbaijani foreign policy.

Mission 
The Ministry of Foreign Affairs is operated in accordance with the Azerbaijani constitution, legislation, regulations, decrees and the main missions are:
 Implementation of the foreign policy of Azerbaijan
 Support for protection of international peace and security through the diplomatic way
 Providing sovereignty, security, territorial integrity of Azerbaijan and its political, economic interests throughout the diplomatic way
 Protection of rights and interests of Azerbaijanis and legal entities abroad
 Ensuring diplomatic and consular relations of Azerbaijan with other states and international organizations
 Providing the state protocol of Azerbaijan
 Diplomatic support and coordination of international, political, economic, scientific, technical, cultural and humanitarian relations of Azerbaijan and its separate state bodies

Structure and organization
As of 2020:
 Minister - Jeyhun Bayramov
 Office of the Minister
 Ambassadors at Large
 Department of State Protocol
 Azerbaijan International Development Agency (AIDA)
 Department of Consular Affairs
 Secretariat of the UNESCO National Commission of Azerbaijan
 Translation Section
 Information Technologies Section
 Department of the Ministry of Foreign Affairs in Nakhchivan Autonomous Republic - By decree of president Ilham Aliyev on 31 October 2005, the department was established in order to govern the foreign policy of Azerbaijan with the participation of Nakhchivan Autonomous Republic.
 Deputy Minister - Hafiz Pashayev
 Diplomatic Academy of MFA
 Deputy Minister - Araz Azimov (multilateral and security affairs)
 Department of Security Affairs
 Department of Foreign Policy Planning and Strategic Studies
 Deputy Minister - Khalaf Khalafov (bilateral and legal affairs)
 First (West) Territorial Department
 Second (East) Territorial Department
 Department of International Law and Treaties
 Deputy Minister - Mahmud Mammed-Guliyev (economic and humanitarian affairs)
 Department of Economic Cooperation and Development
 Department of Human Rights, Democratization and Humanitarian Affairs
 Deputy Minister - Nadir Huseynov (general affairs)
 General Secretariat
 Department of Press and Information Policy
 Department of Human Resources
 Department of Finance Department of Administrative Affairs

Diplomacy Day 
Day of the Diplomatic Service, also known as Diplomacy Day, is an official professional holiday in Azerbaijan. Since 2017, according to the Ilham Aliyev's order on the establishment of a professional holiday for employees of the diplomatic services of Azerbaijan, it is celebrated on July 9 each year.

Diplomatic Academy 

Azerbaijan Diplomatic Academy (ADA) was launched in 2006 in order to prepare global leaders and politicians. In 2014, by the decree of president, it was transformed into university.

Azerbaijani representation abroad 

In order to increase its diplomatic missions abroad, Azerbaijani government in the middle of 2000 launched the related strategy. In 2018 the Ministry of Foreign Affairs maintained the following missions abroad:
 71 diplomatic representations
  5 representatives at international organizations
  8 consulates
  3 honorary consulates
 2 embassies’ representations

The Ministry of Foreign Affairs also cooperates with a number of international and regional organizations. Close relations are maintained with Organization of Islamic Conference (OIC), United Nations (UN), European Union (EU), Commonwealth Independent States (CIS), GUAM, North Atlantic Treaty Organization (NATO), UNESCO, Council of Europe, TURKPA and the Cooperation Council of Turkic Speaking States.

List of ministers

Azerbaijan Democratic Republic

Azerbaijan Soviet Socialist Republic

Republic of Azerbaijan

See also 
List of Foreign Ministers of Azerbaijan
Azerbaijan–European Union relations
Azerbaijan and GUAM relations
Azerbaijan and the United Nations
Azerbaijan–NATO relations
Azerbaijan–OIC relations

References

External links 
Official website of Ministry of Foreign Affairs of Azerbaijan 

Foreign relations of Azerbaijan
Azerbaijan
Foreign Affairs
Azerbaijan, Foreign Affairs